Harry E. Seyler (August 20, 1908 – January 23, 1994) was an American politician and educator.

Born in York, Pennsylvania, Seyler served in the United States Army during World War II. He went to University of Pennsylvania and then taught social studies in the York public school and was principal and assistant superintendent. Seyler served in the Pennsylvania House of Representatives 1948–1954 and then in the Pennsylvania State Senate 1954–1962 as a Democrat. He died in York, Pennsylvania.

Notes

1908 births
1994 deaths
Politicians from York, Pennsylvania
University of Pennsylvania alumni
Educators from Pennsylvania
Democratic Party members of the Pennsylvania House of Representatives
Democratic Party Pennsylvania state senators
20th-century American politicians
United States Army personnel of World War II